The SGB Premiership 2018 was the 84th season of the top division of Great British Speedway in 2018. The season ran between March and October 2018 and had eight teams participating. The line-up of teams remained the same as in 2017. The Swindon Robins were the defending champions after winning the title in 2017. BT Sport continued its TV coverage of the SGB Premiership in 2018. Poole Pirates defeated King's Lynn Stars in the Play off final. It was Poole's tenth tier one title, which brought them level in second place with the Wembley Lions in the historical records.

2018 teams

Regulation changes
At the Speedway AGM in November 2017, a number of changes were made to the rules and regulations for 2018. The biggest change was the introduction of fixed race nights: from now on, all Premiership meetings would be held on either a Monday or Wednesday, with Swindon Robins receiving special dispensation to continue to host home meetings on a Thursday. It was hoped that this would result in more of the world's top riders returning to UK racing. However, Premiership teams were only allowed to sign one rider per team with a Premiership average of over 8 points per match, and this rule prevented some of the world's best riders returning to Premiership teams in 2018. The change to race nights also eliminated the possibility of doubling up riders (riding in both of the top two divisions in British Speedway) by being scheduled to ride for two clubs on the same night.

At the BSPA (British Speedway Promoters Association) annual conference, a decision was made to discontinue the end-of-season play-off for promotion and relegation between the bottom team of the SGB Premiership and the SGB Championship play-off winners.

Results
Teams faced each other four times: twice home and away. The first of the home and away meetings were called the 'A' fixtures, and the second were the 'B' fixtures.

'A' Fixtures

'B' Fixtures

Table

SGB Premiership Final League Table

4 July Rye House Rockets had their membership of the 2018 SGB Premiership annulled by the Speedway Control Bureau. The league table has been updated to represent this news.

Play-offs

Home team scores are in bold
Overall aggregate scores are in red

Semi-finals

Grand final

Home team scores are in bold

Knockout Cup
The 2018 Knockout Cup was the 76th edition and (second under its new name) of the Knockout Cup for tier one teams.

Home team scores are in bold
Overall aggregate scores are in red

Quarter-finals

Semi-finals

Grand final

Charity Shield

Leading averages

Riders & final averages
Belle Vue Aces

 8.73
 8.13
 8.00
 7.89
 7.56
 6.35
 5.49
 5.14
 4.75
 4.13
 3.54

20 March Paul Starke replaced the injured Damian Dróżdż in the Belle Vue team 
26 April Damian Dróżdż replaced Paul Starke in the Belle Vue team 
13 June Jason Garrity replaced the injured Steve Worrall as a short-term replacement in the Belle Vue Aces team
11 July Steve Worrall returned to the Belle Vue after injury replacing short-term replacement Jason Garrity in the side.
1 August Mark Riss replaced Jye Etheridge in the Belle Vue team 
10 August Dimitri Bergé replaced Damian Dróżdż in the Belle Vue team 

King's Lynn Stars

 9.93
 7.87
 7.24
 7.22
 7.08
 6.57
 6.43
 6.40
 4.07
 3.45
 2.67

30 April Michael Palm Toft replaced Lewis Rose in the King's Lynn team 
11 July Simon Lambert replaced the injured Kasper Andersen in the King's Lynn team 
17 July Jason Garrity replaced the injured Lewis Kerr in the King's Lynn team 
6 August Erik Riss replaced short-term signing Jason Garrity in the King's Lynn team 

Leicester Lions

 8.00
 7.23
 6.97
 6.79
 6.29
 6.23
 6.22
 5.98
 4.86
 4.43
 4.17
 4.16
 3.66

4 April Michael Palm Toft replaced the injured Josh Bates in the Leicester team 
20 April Kenneth Bjerre and Todd Kurtz replaced the injured Martin Vaculik and Michael Palm Toft in the Leicester team 
29 June Ricky Wells and Charles Wright replaced the injured Danny King and Kyle Newman in the Leicester team 
18 July Scott Nicholls, Stuart Robson, Josh Auty and Connor Mountain replaced Kenneth Bjerre, Krystian Pieszczek, Todd Kurtz and James Sarjeant in the Leicester team 

Poole Pirates

 8.07
 7.60
 7.48
 7.41
 7.28
 6.88
 6.83
 6.65
 6.32
 6.12
 6.00
 3.38
 1.33

2 April Peter Kildemand replaced Chris Holder in the Poole team 
4 May Stefan Nielsen replaced James Shanes in the Poole team 
12 May Richie Worrall replaced Peter Kildemand in the Poole team 
28 May Paul Starke was used as a short-term replacement replaced the injured Stefan Nielsen in the Poole team until Nicolai Klindt is available 
29 June Frederik Jakobsen replaced Mateusz Szczepaniak in the Poole team 
12 July Chris Harris replaced Linus Sundström in the Poole team 

Rye House Rockets

21 March Aaron Summers replaced Ben Barker in the Rye House team 
3 May Nikolaj Busk Jakobsen replaced the injured Stuart Robson in the Rye House team 
12 June Stuart Robson replaced the injured Edward Kennett in the Rye House team 
4 July Rye House had their membership of the 2018 SGB Premiership annulled by the Speedway Control Bureau.

Somerset Rebels

 9.79
 7.97
 6.97
 6.29
 6.24
 6.15
 5.64
 5.53
 3.81
 1.14

18 June Claus Vissing and Nicolás Covatti replaced Charles Wright and Jonas Jeppesen in the Somerset team 
7 July Aaron Summers replaced Claus Vissing in the Somerset team 

Swindon Robins

 8.54
 7.93
 7.10
 7.07
 6.60
 5.27
 1.03
 0.89

14 May Jack Smith replaced the injured Mitchell Davey in the Swindon team 

Wolverhampton Wolves

 8.43
 8.42
 7.91
 6.09
 5.88
 4.87
 4.76
 4.13

3 August Jonas Andersen replaced Cameron Heeps in the Wolverhampton team

See also
 SGB Championship 2018 – the second division of British speedway
 List of United Kingdom speedway league champions
 Knockout Cup (speedway)

References

SGB Premiership
Elite
2018 in speedway